John G. McNutt was a professor of Public Policy and Administration at the University of Delaware until his retirement in 2021. He is a leading researcher on the use of information and communication technologies in the nonprofit sector. Much of his current work focuses on electronic advocacy, especially the application of technology, data and data science to social action and public policymaking and the use of evidence in informing McNutt has conducted research on child advocacy groups, professional associations, environmental advocacy organizations, political action committees, transnational advocacy organizations and community development corporations. His current work examines four interrelated areas: (1) technology and advocacy for social change, (2) the role of data and data science in public policy, (3) The changing nature of social policy in an information society, (4) Informatics in the public and nonprofit sectors.

His books include:

McNutt, J.G.  (2018) (ed)  Technology, Activism and Social Justice. London & New York:  Oxford University Press.  Forthcoming.
McNutt, J.G. & Hoefer, R. (2016).  Social Welfare Policy: Responding to a Changing World. Lyceum Books/Oxford University Press.
Meenaghan, T., Kilty, K.M, Long, D. & McNutt, J.G. (2013).Policy, Politics and Ethics. Lyceum Books/Oxford University Press. 
Meenaghan, T., Gibbons, W.G. & McNutt, J.G. (2005). Generalist practice in larger settings. [Second Edition]. Lyceum Books/Oxford University Press.
Meenaghan, T., Kilty, K.M & McNutt, J.G. (2004). Social policy analysis and practice. Lyceum Books/Oxford University Press.
Hick, S. & McNutt, J.G.  (eds.) (2002). Advocacy and Activism on the Internet: Perspectives from Community Organization and Social Policy. Lyceum Books/Oxford University Press.  Foreword by Noam Chomsky.
Hoff, M. & McNutt, J.G.  (eds.) (1994).  The Global Environmental Crisis: Implications for Social Welfare and Social Work. Aldershot:  Avebury. Foreword by Mark Lusk.

Recent journal publications include:

McNutt, J.G., Guo, C., Goldkind, L., & An, S. (2018). Technology in Nonprofit organizations and voluntary action. Voluntaristics Review. 3(1) 1-63
McNutt, J.G., Justice, J.B., Melitski, M.J, Ahn, M.J., Siddiqui, S, Carter, D.T*. & Kline, A. D.* (2016).  The diffusion of civic technology and open government in the United States.  Information Polity 21:  153-170.
Justice, J. B. & McNutt, J.G. (2013-2014). Social capital, e-government and fiscal transparency in the states. Public Integrity, 16(1), 5-24.
McNutt, J.G. (2011). Is Social Work Advocacy Worth the Cost? Issues and Barriers for an Economic Analysis of Social Work Political Practice. Research in Social Work practice. 21 (4), 397-403.
Brainard, L. & McNutt, J.G.  (2010). Virtual Government-Citizen Relations: Old Public Administration, New Public Management or New Public Service? Administration and Society. 42,  836-858.

He earned a B.A. from Mars Hill College (1974), an M.S.W. from the University of Alabama (1974), and a Ph.D. from the University of Tennessee (1991).

External links
Policy Magic (John G. McNutt's personal web site)

Internet-based activism
American social workers
Non-profit technology
Mars Hill University alumni
University of Alabama alumni
University of Tennessee alumni
University of Delaware faculty
Living people
Year of birth missing (living people)